Kosovsky is a rural locality (a khutor) in Deminskoye Rural Settlement, Novoanninsky District, Volgograd Oblast, Russia. The population was 98 as of 2010. There are 2 streets.

Geography 
Kosovsky is located in steppe on the Khopyorsko-Buzulukskaya Plain, 40 km west of Novoanninsky (the district's administrative centre) by road. Martynovsky is the nearest rural locality.

References 

Rural localities in Novoanninsky District